Dan Harding's Wife was a radio soap opera in the United States. The 15-minute program was broadcast on NBC from January 20, 1936, through February 10, 1939, and was sponsored by Nabisco for the first nine months of 1938. The show was written by Ken Robinson and directed by J. Clinton Stanley.

Plot 

A 1938 article in Radio Guide magazine commented, "The story of Dan Harding's Wife is one that will strike a warmly responsive note in the hearts of all wives and mothers who are, because of economic necessity, separated from their husbands.:

The broadcast was set 19 years after Dan and Rhoda Harding were married in South America. He was a mining engineer there, and she had come there with her father. An initially happy marriage ran into problems when Rhoda became pregnant. Dan felt that a mining camp would not be a good place to raise the twins, so he sent Rhoda and the babies to the United States. In the program, twins Donna and Dean were 18 years old. They had seen their father only once or twice a year at best. The reunions ended, however, when Rhoda received word that Dan had been killed in a mining disaster in Iraq. The article in Radio Guide summarized Rhoda's predicament: "Left almost penniless, Rhoda takes over a rooming house in the poorer section of the town and attempts to eke out a living."

Cast 

Buxton and Owen's The Big Broadcast lists the cast of Dan Harding's Wife as follows:

Other sources list additional cast members as follows: Norman Berry (announcer) and Mercedes McCambridge (role not specified).

See also 

 List of radio soaps

References

External links 
 "Radio Playbill: Dan Harding's Wife" article in Radio Guide, Nov. 12, 1938 (Images of article's two pages)
 "Radio Playbill: Dan Harding's Wife" article in Radio Guide, Nov. 12, 1938 (PDF of complete issue; article is on pp. 6-7.

American radio soap operas
1930s American radio programs
American radio dramas
NBC radio programs